Jacek Bednarz (born 5 June 1967) is a retired Polish football midfielder.

References

1967 births
Living people
Polish footballers
AKS Chorzów players
Ruch Chorzów players
Legia Warsaw players
Pogoń Szczecin players
Association football midfielders
Poland international footballers